Akeem Williams (born 29 April 1993) is a footballer from Chateaubelair, Saint Vincent and the Grenadines. Willams plays for the Saint Vincent and the Grenadines national football team.

International career

International goals
Scores and results list Saint Vincent and the Grenadines' goal tally first.

References

Saint Vincent and the Grenadines footballers
Saint Vincent and the Grenadines international footballers
Living people
Association football forwards
1993 births